Stephan Keiser (born 4 November 1958) is a Swiss curler and curling coach.

He was a coach of Swiss men's team at the 1998 Winter Olympics where they were the first Olympic champions in men's curling.

Teams

Record as a coach of national teams

References

External links

Living people
1958 births
Swiss male curlers
Swiss curling champions
Swiss curling coaches